Nerkin Karmiraghbyur is a village in the Berd Municipality of the Tavush Province of Armenia.

Notable people
Arsen Galstyan, Olympic and European champion in judo representing Russia.

References

External links 

Populated places in Tavush Province